Cymatura spumans is a species of beetle in the family Cerambycidae. It was described by Félix Édouard Guérin-Méneville in 1847, originally under the genus Xylorhiza. It has a wide distribution in Africa.

References

Xylorhizini
Beetles described in 1847